The 2015–16 TSV 1860 Munich season was the club's 12th consecutive season in the 2. Bundesliga.

Review

July/August
On 20 June 2015, prior to the start of the season, Torsten Fröhling extended his contract.

September

October
Benno Möhlmann replaced Fröhling as head coach on 6 October 2015.

November

December

February

March

April/May
Daniel Bierofka took over for Möhlmann as head coach on 19 April 2016.

Matches

2. Bundesliga

League table

Results summary

Fixtures and results

DFB-Pokal

Player information

Transfers

In

Out

Statistics

|}

References

TSV 1860 Munich seasons
Munich, TSV 1860